Lorenz Snack-World (Lorenz Bahlsen Snack Gruppe until 2001) is a German food company based in Neu-Isenburg. It was founded in 1999.

Lorenz produces a range of potato chips. The company exports products to about 30 countries and offers private-label production services.

References

  Manager Strategic Sales wechselt zu Marketing-Dienstleister - Lebensmittel Zeitung
  Neuer nationaler Verkaufsdirektor Handel für Warsteiner | Markenartikel

External links 
 

Food and drink companies of Germany
Food and drink companies established in 1999
1999 establishments in Germany
Companies based in Hesse